The following are lists of devices categorized as types of telescopes or devices associated with telescopes. They are broken into major classifications with many variations due to professional, amateur, and commercial sub-types. Telescopes can be classified by optical design or mechanical design/construction. Telescopes can also be classified by where they are placed, such as space telescopes. One major determining factor is type of light, or particle being observed including devices referred to as "telescopes" that do not form an image or use optics. Some telescopes are classified by the task they perform; for example Solar telescopes are all designs that look at the Sun, Dobsonian telescopes are designed to be low cost and portable, Aerial telescopes overcame the optical shortcomings of 17th-century objective lenses, etc.

List of optical telescope types
Optical telescopes can be classified by three primary optical designs (refractor, reflector, or catadioptric), by sub-designs of these types, by how they are constructed, or by the task they perform. They all have their different advantages and disadvantages and they are used in different areas of professional and amateur astronomy.

List of telescope types working outside the optical spectrum

Atmospheric Cherenkov telescope used to detect gamma rays
Infrared telescope
Radio telescope
Submillimeter telescope
Ultraviolet telescope (see also Ultraviolet astronomy)
X-ray telescope (see also X-ray astronomy)
Wolter telescope

List of broad spectrum telescopes
 Fast Fourier Transform Telescope

List of telescope mounts types
Optical and other types of telescopes are  mounted on different types of mounts.

 Fixed mount
 Transit mount
 Zenith mount
 Altazimuth mount
 Alt-alt (altitude-altitude) mount
 Equatorial mount
 Equatorial platform
 Poncet Platform
 Open fork mount
 German equatorial mount
 English mount (Polar frame mount)
 Modified English mount 
 Barn door tracker (Scotch mount)
 Springfield mount
 Hexapod mount
 Infinite-axis telescope

See also

 Lists of telescopes
 List of largest infrared telescopes
 List of largest optical reflecting telescopes

Misc
 History of the telescope

Astronomical imaging
Telescope types